The ninth series of The Great British Bake Off began on 28 August 2018, with this being the second series to be broadcast on Channel 4. The series is presented by Noel Fielding and Sandi Toksvig, with judges Paul Hollywood and Prue Leith. This series saw a few changes to the usual format: the first episode being Biscuit Week (the previous 8 series began with a Cake Week), the documentary inserts were dropped, and the finale included the competitors doing a technical challenge outside the tent for the first time.

The series was won by Rahul Mandal, with Kim-Joy Hewlett and Ruby Bhogal as the runners-up.

Bakers

Results summary 

 Terry was ill and unable to compete in episode 4, but the bakers agreed he should return to the competition the following week. At the end of episode 4, the judges decided it was unfair to eliminate anyone in Terry's absence. Consequently, two bakers were eliminated the following week.

Colour key:

Episodes

Episode 1: Biscuits 
Breaking with tradition, this year the series kicked off with biscuit week. For the first challenge of the series, the bakers were tasked to bake 24 regional biscuits that needed to be all identical, and said something about them and a place in the British Isles. For the first technical challenge of this series, they are tasked to make one of Paul's childhood favourites - Wagon Wheels. Finally, for the showstopper, the bakers had to create a spectacular 3D biscuit self-portrait that needed to be constructed with layers of biscuits and judged while placed upright on an easel stand.

Episode 2: Cakes 
For their signature bakes, the bakers were required to create a traybake sliced into 16 identical pieces. The technical challenge was set by Prue, which featured a cake with an unusual ingredient: Le Gâteau Vert, one of French painter Claude Monet's favourite birthday treats. The cake featured a pistachio genoise sponge sandwiched by a pistachio Crème au Beurre and covered by a green fondant coloured by spinach. For the showstopper, the bakers were required to create a technically demanding chocolate collar cake, featuring at least two tiers.

Episode 3: Bread 
For their signature bakes the bakers had three hours to create a British classic: 12 Chelsea buns. In the technical challenge the bakers, using Paul's recipe, were tasked to make a batch of 8 grilled non-yeasted garlic naan breads, brushed with garlic ghee and topped with coriander, in only one hour. Finally, for their 5-hour showstopper, the bakers were asked to create a three-tiered Korovai, elaborately decorated for a celebratory occasion; most of the bakers chose the traditional wedding theme.

Episode 4: Desserts 
At the start of this episode, it was announced that Terry was not able to compete this week due to illness. But, with the agreement of all, he would be allowed to come back to the competition the following week. For their signature bakes, the bakers were required to create a meringue roulade. For their technical challenge, using Prue's recipe, the bakers were tasked to produce a raspberry blancmange served with 12 Langues de Chat biscuits. For their showstoppers, the bakers were tasked to create a spectacular melting chocolate ball dessert: a chocolate sphere which would be melted away with a hot sauce, revealing the dessert hidden inside. After the three challenges, Briony and Karen were left as the bottom two. However, nobody was eliminated this week, as the judges deemed it would be unfair to send anyone home with Terry's absence. However, this meant two bakers would be eliminated the following week.

Episode 5: Spice 
For the signature challenge, the bakers were tasked to bake a ginger cake. For the technical challenge, using Paul's recipe, the bakers must create a batch of 12 Ma'amoul, an ancient pastry from the Middle East that none of the bakers had heard of. In the batch, 6 of the ma'amoul must be filled with walnuts and shaped with a mould, and the other 6 must be filled with a date paste and decorated by pinching the dough with ma'amoul tongs. For their showstoppers, the bakers were tasked to create a beautiful, gravity-defying spiced biscuit chandelier. Prue was unwell during the showstoppers round, and as a result, Paul was left as the solo judge.

Episode 6: Pastry 
For the signature challenge, the bakers were tasked to make 12 samosas, in which 6 must be savoury and the other 6 must be sweet. The samosas must also be served with a dip to complement them. The technical challenge was set by Prue, and the bakers were required to make 6 Puits D'amour, meaning "well of love". For the showstopper challenge, the bakers were tasked to create a shaped banquet pie that would be beautifully decorated enough to act as a centrepiece at a Tudor banquet.

Episode 7: Vegan 
The remaining six bakers were required in the signature challenge to make eight savoury vegan tartlets of two different fillings using shortcrust pastry that contained no butter or eggs. For the technical challenge, using Prue's recipe, the bakers were tasked to make a vegan tropical fruit pavlova using aquafaba in place of egg whites to create the meringue. For the showstopper, the bakers were tasked to create a beautiful vegan celebratory cake.

Episode 8: Danish 
In the quarterfinal signature challenge, the final five bakers were tasked to make a rye bread and make two types of Smørrebrød using it. For the technical challenge, the bakers were instructed to make 14 Æbleskiver containing a cinnamon and apple filling, and served with a strawberry jam dipping sauce. For the showstopper challenge, the bakers were required to make a kagemand or a kagekone, a traditional Danish birthday cake made from Danish pastry that resembles a boy or a girl. The bakers' kagemand/kagekone must be based on someone the bakers recognised and they must use at least three different confectionery making skills within it.

Episode 9: Pâtisserie (Semi-final) 
In the Pâtisserie semifinal signature challenge, the bakers were tasked to make 24 dipped Madeleines in two designs and flavours, in 90 minutes. For the technical challenge, the bakers tackled Prue's complex recipe for Torta Setteveli, a seven-layered cake containing two light chocolate genoise sponges, hazelnut bavarois, crunchy praline base and a chocolate mousse, topped with a chocolate mirror glaze, to be completed in  four 1/2 hours. For the penultimate showstopper challenge, the bakers created a Parisian pâtisserie window containing 36 pâtisserie in three types: choux pastry,  and puff pastry mille-feuille, in five hours.

Episode 10: Final 
For the final signature challenge, the last three bakers were required to make 12 iced doughnuts of two types, filled and ring, in three hours. The technical challenge was another Bake Off first, where the bakers were asked to carry out the challenge outside the tent. Using Paul's recipe, the bakers needed to produce 6 pita breads in 90 minutes, to be served with three different dips: baba ghanoush, smoked garlic salsa verde and burnt pepper salsa, using the open campfire set up outside. For the final showstopper, the bakers were asked to create an incredible landscape dessert with at least three different elements within it, in four and a half hours. During the showstopper, one of Rahul's storage glass jars exploded under the intense heat, which resulted in shards of broken glass shattered all over his bench and potentially contaminated his bakes. This required cleaning up from the production team. As a result, he was given an extra 15 minutes for the challenge.

Specials 
The two holiday specials each feature four returning contestants from the series 5–8.

The Great Christmas Bake Off featured Liam Charles (Series 8), Flo Atkins (Series 8), Andrew Smyth (Series 7) and Jane Beedle (Series 7). The special was won by Jane Beedle.

The Great Festive Bake Off featured the return of winner Candice Brown (Series 7), Steven Carter-Bailey (Series 8), Tamal Ray (Series 6) and Kate Henry (Series 5). The special was won by Steven Carter-Bailey.

The Great Christmas Bake Off 
For the signature challenge, the bakers were asked to create a dozen of iced biscuits based on the theme of The Twelve Days of Christmas, which can be the bakers' own personal interpretation. The technical challenge was set by Paul, where the bakers were tasked to produce 6 Icelandic Laufabrauð in 1 1/4 hours. The final showstopper challenge gave the bakers four hours to make a cake in the shape of a Christmas present that reveals a spectacular hidden design when cut open.

The Great Festive Bake Off 
The returning bakers were tasked to bake an iced stollen wreath for their signature challenge in only three hours. The technical challenge was set by Prue, who asked the bakers to make 4 snow eggs crowned with delicate spun sugar cages. For the final showstopper challenge, the bakers were tasked to make a 3D New Year's Resolution Cake, where all decorations must be edible.

Ratings 
The final was watched by an overnight viewing audience figure of 7.5 million, down from the previous final of 7.7 million and the lowest since 2012. The ratings below are cumulative figures over longer periods, and they include multiple-screen viewing figures (on TV, computer, tablet and smartphone), the first year this system was implemented, and the figures are therefore slightly higher than it would have been without the multiple-screen viewing figures.

References 

Series 9
2018 British television seasons